Hemianthus callitrichoides (also known as dwarf baby tears, cuba or simply the initials HC) is a  semi-aquatic plant in the family Linderniaceae. The plant is endemic to West Indies, where it is native to the islands of The Bahamas, Cuba, Hispaniola, Jamaica, and Puerto Rico. In The Bahamas, this species known as "water-starwort".

This species is commonly used as a foreground or carpeting plant in planted aquariums. When used in aquascaping, this species is known to have relatively high light and CO₂ requirements. Once planted, each portion will produce runners which basically are individual stems that branch off and grow along the substrate.

Unlike the related Hemianthus micranthemoides, H. callitrichoides is thought to be native only to Cuba.

References

Scrophulariaceae
Aquatic plants
Plants described in 1862